"Abendempfindung an Laura", K. 523, is a song by Wolfgang Amadeus Mozart dated June 24, 1787, in Vienna, written at the time of the opera Don Giovanni and Eine kleine Nachtmusik.

Text 

The title translates as "Evening Sentiment". The poet is unknown, but scholars speculate the text may be written by Joachim Heinrich Campe. The song is in a melancholy mood, with the singer reviewing his failed romantic relationship and the inevitablity of death.

Abend ist’s, die Sonne ist verschwunden,
Und der Mond strahlt Silberglanz;
So entflieh’n des Lebens schönste Stunden,
Flieh’n vorüber wie im Tanz!
Bald entflieht des Lebens bunte Szene,
Und der Vorhang rollt herab.
Aus ist unser Spiel! Des Freundes Träne
Fließet schon auf unser Grab.
Bald vielleicht mir weht, wie Westwind leise,
Eine stille Ahnung zu –
Schließ’ ich dieses Lebens Pilgerreise,
Fliege in das Land der Ruh’.
Werdet ihr dann an meinem Grabe weinen,
Trauernd meine Asche seh’n,
Dann, o Freunde, will ich euch erscheinen
Und will Himmel auf euch weh’n.
Schenk’ auch du ein Tränchen mir
Und pflücke mir ein Veilchen auf mein Grab;
Und mit deinem seelenvollen Blicke
Sieh’ dann sanft auf mich herab.
Weih mir eine Träne, und ach!
Schäme dich nur nicht, sie mir zu weih’n,
Oh, sie wird in meinem Diademe
Dann die schönste Perle sein.

Music

Mozart's longest song, lasting 110 bars, in Alla breve  time the key of F major. The varying music moods, wide ranging tonal scheme and contemplation of sadness is reminiscent of Schubert. The composer is in an unusually restrained and contemplative mood. A typical performance lasts around 5 minutes.

References

Further reading
 "Who was Mozart's Laura? by David Paisey, Electronic British Library Journal 2006, article 9

External links

 (with recordings, discography)

, Dietrich Fischer-Dieskau (baritone), Daniel Barenboim (piano)
, Elisabeth Schwarzkopf (soprano), Gerald Moore (piano)
 

Compositions by Wolfgang Amadeus Mozart
1787 compositions
1787 songs
Compositions in F major